Vasili Nikolaevich Pankov (born 15 August 1968) is a Belarusian former ice hockey player. He played for Yunost Minsk, Augsburger Panther, Slovan Bratislava, Lada Togliatti, and Tivali Minsk during his career. He also played for the Belarusian national team at the 1998 and 2002 Winter Olympics, and multiple World Championships. Pankov was tested positive for 19-Norandrosterone and retroactively disqualified for the 2002 Winter Olympics. After his playing career he turned to coaching.

Career statistics

Regular season and playoffs

International

References

External links
 

1968 births
Living people
Augsburger Panther players
Belarusian ice hockey coaches
Belarusian ice hockey centres
HC Dinamo Minsk players
HC Lada Togliatti players
HC Slovan Bratislava players
Ice hockey players at the 1998 Winter Olympics
Ice hockey players at the 2002 Winter Olympics
Olympic ice hockey players of Belarus
Soviet ice hockey centres
Ice hockey people from Minsk
Tivali Minsk players
Yunost Minsk players
Belarusian expatriate sportspeople in Germany
Belarusian expatriate sportspeople in Russia
Belarusian expatriate sportspeople in Slovakia
Belarusian expatriate ice hockey people
Expatriate ice hockey players in Slovakia
Expatriate ice hockey players in Russia
Expatriate ice hockey players in Germany